HC NSA Sofia  is an ice hockey team in Sofia, Bulgaria. They currently play in the Bulgarian Hockey League.

History
The club was founded in 2009 as part of the National Sports Academy of Bulgaria. They played in the Balkan League during the 2010-11 and 2011-12 seasons, winning the championship both seasons. NSA joined the Bulgarian Hockey League for the 2012-13 season, finishing in second place behind CSKA Sofia.

Achievements
 Bulgarian Champion (1): 2022

References

External links
Official website
Team profile on eurohockey.com

Bulgarian Hockey League teams
Ice hockey teams in Bulgaria